Larsen-Feiten Band is the self-titled album by Neil Larsen and Buzz Feiten, released in 1980 on Warner Bros. Records.

"Who'll Be the Fool Tonight" peaked at #29 on the Billboard Hot 100, becoming the duo's only Top 40 hit.

Track listing

Personnel
Neil Larsen - lead and backing vocals, keyboards
Buzz Feiten - lead and backing vocals, guitar
Kim Hutchcroft - horns
Lenny Castro - backing vocals, percussion
Willie Weeks - bass
Art Rodriguez - drums
Larry Williams - horns
Bill Reichenbach - horns
Chuck Findley - horns

Production
Producer: Tommy LiPuma
Mixing: Al Schmitt
Engineers: Bill Taylor, Don Henderson, Terry Becker
Photography: Norman Seeff & Darius Anthony

Charts
Singles

References

External links

1980 albums
Albums produced by Tommy LiPuma
Warner Records albums
Neil Larsen albums
Collaborative albums
Buzz Feiten albums